Cymindis suturalis is a species of ground beetle in the subfamily Harpalinae. It was described by Pierre François Marie Auguste Dejean in 1825.

References

suturalis
Beetles described in 1825